We Are Toonz is an American hip hop group from Stone Mountain, Georgia, formed in 2013, known for the viral debut dance single "Drop That #NaeNae", inspired by Martin Lawrence's character Sheneneh Jenkins from his popular 1990's sitcom Martin.

The group members are Tavin "Levi" Bing-Gardner, Christopher "Crash Bandit" Major, Kavin "K.B." Bing-Gardner and Calvin Larmar "Callamar" Glass

History
The group members have danced and rapped together since childhood. Levi and K.B. are brothers and Crash Bandit is their cousin.

The Crew
We Are Toonz has many members: Bear, Rari, rique, Pj, Levi, KB, Crash Bandit, Cal Lamar, Bianca Jay, Lil Spinz, dancing dan, Marc is art.  Four members are not in the group: Bear, Pj, Rari, Lil Spinz

Music career

Social Media Influence

We Are Toonz released Drop That #NaeNae in 2013 without much fanfare. The group posted a video of themselves performing the #NaeNae Dance on the social video sharing website Vine and other social media websites like Instagram, Twitter and YouTube. As the song gained momentum the Drop That #NaeNae went viral. The Michigan State Football team can be seen dropping that #NaeNae on YouTube, and breaking down the #NaeNae dance on Vine. Video postings from other college teams dropping that #NaeNae to foster team spirit started going viral as well, Ohio State, Temple University, Auburn University, Notre Dame, and Mercer Bear basketball team victory #NaeNae over Duke's Blue Devils.

Houston Rockets', Dwight Howard posted videos of himself dropping the #NaeNae. After which, he reached out to the group to record a video in Atlanta. Washington Wizards', John Wall celebrated his slam dunk contest win by dropping that "NaeNae" with Paul George. Due to the Vines, videos and GIFs the group saw a 311% spike in mentions of the #NaeNae hashtag.

Coca-Cola

In August 2014 Coca-Cola released a commercial featuring We Are Toonz for their Ahh Campaign targeting the teen and young adult demographic. We Are Toonz are the first hip-hop act to collaborate with Coca-Cola since R&B singer Tyrese Gibson. The group was selected by the brand after seeing them perform at the World of Coke Ahh stage at the 2013 BET Hip-Hop Awards.

Discography

Singles

References

External links

Musical quartets
Epic Records artists
Musical groups established in 2014
Musical groups from Georgia (U.S. state)
Southern hip hop groups
Rappers from Atlanta
Musical groups from Atlanta
African-American musical groups
American hip hop groups
2014 establishments in Georgia (U.S. state)